Marine mammals comprise over 130 living and recently extinct species in three taxonomic orders.  The Society for Marine Mammalogy, an international scientific society, maintains a list of valid species and subspecies, most recently updated in October 2015. This list follows the Society's taxonomy regarding and subspecies.

Conservation status codes listed follow the IUCN Red List of Threatened Species (v. 2014.3; data current at 19 January 2015) and are clickable to link to IUCN Red List species pages.

Order Cetartiodactyla
Footnote on use of Cetartiodactyla

Cetacea

Mysticeti

Balaenidae

 North Atlantic right whale, Eubalaena glacialis 
 North Pacific right whale, Eubalaena japonica 
 Southern right whale, Eubalaena australis 
 Bowhead whale or Greenland right whale, Balaena mysticetus

Balaenopteridae

 Common minke whale, Balaenoptera acutorostrata  (ssp. acutorostrata - North Atlantic minke whale , ssp. scammoni - North Pacific minke whale , unnamed ssp. dwarf minke whale )
 Antarctic minke whale, Balaenoptera bonaerensis 
 Sei whale, Balaenoptera borealis  (ssp. borealis - northern sei whale , ssp. schlegellii - southern sei whale )
 Bryde's whale, Balaenoptera edeni  (ssp. brydei - Bryde's whale , ssp. edeni - Eden's whale  )
 Omura's whale, Balaenoptera omurai 
 Blue whale, Balaenoptera musculus  (ssp. musculus - northern blue whale , ssp. brevicauda - pygmy blue whale , ssp. intermedia - southern blue whale , ssp. indica - great Indian blue whale )
 Fin whale, Balaenoptera physalus  (ssp. patachonica pygmy fin whale , ssp. physalus - northern fin whale  but Mediterranean Subpopulation , ssp. quoyi - southern fin whale )
 Humpback whale, Megaptera novaeangliae  (ssp. novaeangliae North Atlantic humpback whale , ssp. kuzira - North Pacific humpback whale , ssp. australis - southern humpback whale  but Oceania subpopulation , isolated subpopulation in Arabian Sea )

Neobalaenidae

 Pygmy right whale, Caperea marginata

Eschrichtiidae

 Gray whale, Eschrichtius robustus

Odontoceti

Physeteridae

 Sperm whale, Physeter macrocephalus

Kogiidae

 Pygmy sperm whale, Kogia breviceps 
 Dwarf sperm whale, Kogia simus

Ziphiidae

 Arnoux's beaked whale, Berardius arnuxii 

 Baird's beaked whale, Berardius bairdii 
 Sato's beaked whale, Berardius minimus 
 Northern bottlenose whale, Hyperoodon ampullatus 
 Southern bottlenose whale, Hyperoodon planifrons 
 Tropical bottlenose whale, Indopacetus pacificus 
 Sowerby's beaked whale, Mesoplodon bidens 
 Andrews' beaked whale, Mesoplodon bowdoini 
 Hubbs' beaked whale, Mesoplodon carlhubbsi 
 Blainville's beaked whale, Mesoplodon densirostris 
 Gervais' beaked whale, Mesoplodon europaeus 
 Ginkgo-toothed beaked whale, Mesoplodon ginkgodens 
 Gray's beaked whale, Mesoplodon grayi 
 Hector's beaked whale, Mesoplodon hectori 
 Deraniyagala's beaked whale, Mesoplodon hotaula 
 Strap-toothed whale, Mesoplodon layardii 
 True's beaked whale, Mesoplodon mirus 
 Perrin's beaked whale, Mesoplodon perrini 
 Pygmy beaked whale, Mesoplodon peruvianus 
 Stejneger's beaked whale, Mesoplodon stejnegeri 
 Spade-toothed whale, Mesoplodon traversii 
 Shepherd's beaked whale, Tasmacetus shepherdi 
 Cuvier's beaked whale, Ziphius cavirostris

Platanistidae

 Ganges river dolphin, Platanista gangetica 
 Indus river dolphin, Platanista minor

Iniidae

 Amazon river dolphin, Inia geoffrensis  (ssp. geoffrensis - common boto , ssp. boliviensis - Bolivian bufeo )

Lipotidae

 Baiji, Lipotes vexillifer , possibly

Pontoporiidae

 La Plata dolphin (Franciscana), Pontoporia blainvillei

Monodontidae

 Beluga, Delphinapterus leucas  (Cook Inlet Subpopulation )
 Narwhal, Monodon monoceros

Delphinidae

 Commerson's dolphin, Cephalorhynchus commersonii  (ssp. commersonii - Commerson's dolphin , ssp. kerguelenensis - Kerguelen Islands Commerson’s dolphin )
 Chilean dolphin, Cephalorhynchus eutropia 
 Heaviside's dolphin, Cephalorhynchus heavisidii 
 Hector's dolphin, Cephalorhynchus hectori (ssp. hectori - South Island Hector’s dolphin , ssp. maui - Maui's dolphin or North Island Hector’s dolphin )
 Long-beaked common dolphin, Delphinus capensis  (ssp. capensis - long-beaked common dolphin , ssp. tropicalis - Indo-Pacific common dolphin )
 Short-beaked common dolphin, Delphinus delphis  (ssp.  delphis - short-beaked common dolphin Mediterranean Subpopulation , ssp. ponticus - Black Sea common dolphin )
 Pygmy killer whale, Feresa attenuata 
 Short-finned pilot whale, Globicephala macrorhynchus 
 Long-finned pilot whale, Globicephala melas  (ssp. edwardii - southern long-finned pilot whale , ssp. melas - North Atlantic long-finned pilot whale , unnamed spp. - North Pacific long-finned pilot whale )
 Risso's dolphin, Grampus griseus 
 Fraser's dolphin, Lagenodelphis hosei 
 White-beaked dolphin, Lagenorhynchus albirostris 
 Atlantic white-sided dolphin, Lagenorhynchus acutus 
Peale's dolphin, Lagenorhynchus australis 
 Hourglass dolphin, Lagenorhynchus cruciger 
 Pacific white-sided dolphin, Lagenorhynchus obliquidens 
 Dusky dolphin, Lagenorhynchus obscurus  (ssp. fitzroyi - Fitzroy’s dolphin , ssp. obscurus - African dusky dolphin , ssp. posidonia - Chilean dusky dolphin , unnamed spp. - New Zealand dusky dolphin )
Northern right whale dolphin, Lissodelphis borealis 
 Southern right whale dolphin, Lissodelphis peronii 
 Irrawaddy dolphin, Orcaella brevirostris 
 Australian snubfin dolphin, Orcaella heinsohni 
 Orca (killer whale), Orcinus orca  (unnamed ssp. - resident killer whale , unnamed ssp. transient killer whale )
 Melon-headed whale, Peponocephala electra 
 False killer whale, Pseudorca crassidens 
 Atlantic humpback dolphin, Sousa teuszii  
 Indo-Pacific humpbacked dolphin, Sousa chinensis , (ssp. chinensis - Chinese humpback dolphin , ssp. taiwanensis - Taiwanese humpback dolphins )
 Indian Ocean humpback dolphin, Sousa plumbea 
 Australian humpback dolphin, Sousa sahulensis 
 Tucuxi, Sotalia fluvialis 
 Guiana dolphin (Costero), Sotalia guianensis 
 Pantropical spotted dolphin, Stenella attenuata  (ssp. attenuata - Offshore pantropical spotted dolphin , ssp. graffmani - Coastal pantropical spotted dolphin )
 Clymene dolphin, Stenella clymene 
 Striped dolphin, Stenella coeruleoalba 
 Atlantic spotted dolphin, Stenella frontalis 
 Spinner dolphin, Stenella longirostris  (ssp. centroamericana - Central American spinner dolphin , ssp. longirostris - Gray’s spinner dolphin , ssp. orientalis - Eastern spinner dolphin , ssp. roseiventris - dwarf spinner dolphin )
 Rough-toothed dolphin, Steno bredanensis 
 Indo-Pacific bottlenose dolphin, Tursiops aduncus 
 Common bottlenose dolphin, Tursiops truncatus  (ssp. truncatus - Atlantic bottlenose dolphin Fiordland subpopulation  and Mediterranean subpopulation , ssp. gillii - Pacific bottlenose dolphin, ssp. poncticus - Black Sea bottlenose dolphin )
 Burrunan dolphin, Tursiops australis

Phocoenidae

 Indo-Pacific finless porpoise, Neophocaena phocaenoides 
 Narrow-ridged finless porpoise, Neophocaena asiaeorientalis , (spp. asiaeorientalis - Yangtze finless porpoise , ssp. sumameri - East Asian finless porpoise (sunameri) )
 Spectacled porpoise, Phocoena dioptrica 
 Harbour porpoise, Phocoena phocoena  (Baltic Sea subpopoulation )  (ssp. phocoena - Atlantic harbour porpoise , ssp. vomerina - Eastern Pacific harbour porpoise , ssp. relicta - Black Sea harbour porpoise , unnamed ssp. Western Pacific harbour porpoise )
 Vaquita, Phocoena sinus 
 Burmeister's porpoise, Phocoena spinipinnis 
 Dall’s porpoise, Phocoenoides dalli  (ssp. dalli - Dalli-type Dall’s porpoise , ssp. truei - Truei-type Dall’s porpoise)

Order Sirenia

Trichechidae 

 Amazonian manatee, Trichechus inunguis 
 West Indian manatee, Trichechus manatus  (ssp. latirostris - Florida manatee , ssp. manatus - Antillean manatee )
 African manatee, Trichechus senegalensis

Dugongidae 

 Dugong, Dugong dugon 
 Steller's sea cow, Hydrodamalis gigas

Order Carnivora

Pinnipedia

Otariidae

 Brown fur seal, Arctocephalus pusillus  (ssp. pusillus - Cape fur seal , ssp. doriferus - Australian fur seal )
South American fur seal, Arctophoca australis  (ssp. australis - South American fur seal , unnamed ssp. - Peruvian fur seal )
 New Zealand fur seal, Arctophoca forsteri 
 Galápagos fur seal, Arctophoca galapagoensis 
 Antarctic fur seal, Arctophoca gazella 
 Juan Fernández fur seal, Arctophoca philippii 
 Guadalupe fur seal, Arctophoca townsendi 
 Subantarctic fur seal, Arctophoca tropicalis 
 Northern fur seal, Callorhinus ursinus 
 Steller sea lion, Eumetopias jubatus  (ssp. jubatus - western Steller sea lion , ssp. monteriensis - Loughlin’s Steller sea lion )
 Australian sea lion, Neophoca cinerea 
 South American sea lion, Otaria byronia 
 New Zealand sea lion, Phocarctos hookeri 
 California sea lion, Zalophus californianus 
 Japanese sea lion, Zalophus japonicus 
 Galápagos sea lion, Zalophus wollebaeki

Odobenidae

 Walrus, Odobenus rosmarus  (ssp. divergens - Pacific walrus , ssp. rosmarus - Atlantic walrus )

Phocidae

 Hooded seal, Cystophora cristata 
 Bearded seal, Erignathus barbatus  (ssp. barbatus - Atlantic bearded seal , ssp. nauticus - Pacific bearded seal )
 Grey seal, Halichoerus grypus  (ssp. grypus - Western Atlantic grey seal , ssp. macrorhynchus - Eastern Atlantic grey seal )
 Ribbon seal, Histriophoca fasciata 
 Leopard seal, Hydrurga leptonyx 
 Weddell seal, Leptonychotes weddellii 
 Crabeater seal, Lobodon carcinophagus 
 Southern elephant seal, Mirounga leonina 
 Northern elephant seal, Mirounga angustirostris 
 Mediterranean monk seal, Monachus monachus 
 Hawaiian monk seal, Neomonachus schauinslandi 
 Caribbean monk seal, Neomonachus tropicalis 
 Ross seal, Ommatophoca rossii 
 Harp seal, Pagophilus groenlandicus 
 Harbor seal, Phoca vitulina  (ssp. vitulina - Atlantic harbor seal , ssp. mellonae - Ungava harbor seal , ssp. richardii - Pacific harbour seal )
 Spotted seal, Phoca largha 
 Ringed seal, Pusa hispida  (ssp. hispida - Arctic ringed seal , ssp. botnica  - Baltic ringed seal  , ssp. ochotensis - Okhotsk ringed seal , ssp. ladogensis - Lake Logoda ringed seal , ssp. saimensis - Saima seal )
 Caspian seal, Pusa caspica 
 Baikal seal, Pusa sibirica

Ursidae

 Polar bear, Ursus maritimus

Mustelidae

 Sea otter, Enhydra lutris  (ssp. kenyoni - northern sea otter , ssp. lutris - common sea otter , ssp. nereis - southern sea otter )
 Marine otter, Lontra felina 
 Sea mink, Neogale macrodon

See also

 List of mammals
 List of cetaceans

Footnotes

References 

Marine mammals